Raimonds Miglinieks (born July 16, 1970 in Riga, Latvian Soviet Socialist Republic, USSR) is a retired Latvian professional basketball player and basketball coach. Standing at a height of 1.90 m (6'2 ") tall, he was a point guard with excellent court vision.

College career
Miglinieks played college basketball in the United States, at the University of California, Irvine, with the Anteaters. He led the NCAA Division I in assists per game in the 1995–96 season, with an average of 8.5 assists per game. He was named the Big West Conference Player of the Year in 1996.

Professional career
Miglinieks played in the EuroLeague with Śląsk Wrocław and CSKA Moscow. He led the 2000–01 FIBA SuproLeague in assists, with an average of 7.0 per game.

National team career
Miglinieks was a regular member of the senior men's Latvian national basketball team. He was a part of the Latvian squad that finished in 8th place at the 2001 EuroBasket.

Professional career
Miglinieks' brother, Igors, was also a professional basketball player.

References

External links 
Euroleague.net Profile
FIBA Europe Profile

1970 births
Living people
Basketball players from Riga
BK VEF Rīga players
Latvian expatriate basketball people in Russia
KK Włocławek players
Latvian expatriate basketball people in the United States
Latvian expatriate basketball people in Poland
Latvian men's basketball players
PBC CSKA Moscow players
Point guards
Riverside City Tigers men's basketball players
Śląsk Wrocław basketball players
UC Irvine Anteaters men's basketball players